Paolo Pambianco (born 11 July 1967) is a former professional tennis player from Italy.

Biography
Born in Forl', he is the son of Arnaldo Pambianco, a cyclist who won the 1961 Giro d'Italia.

Pambianco began competing on the professional tour in 1987. His best performance on the Grand Prix circuit came in 1989 when he made the quarter-finals of the Bologna Outdoor tournament. He reached his best ranking of 160 in the world in 1991.

He won a bronze medal for Italy in the men's singles event at the 1991 Mediterranean Games held in Athens.

References

External links
 
 

1967 births
Living people
Italian male tennis players
People from Forlì
Mediterranean Games bronze medalists for Italy
Mediterranean Games medalists in tennis
Competitors at the 1991 Mediterranean Games
Sportspeople from the Province of Forlì-Cesena
20th-century Italian people